The Clovelly-class fleet tenders, also known as the Cartmel class, are a class of Royal Maritime Auxiliary Service boats built between 1967 and 1982. The class was named after villages and small towns in Great Britain. Six of the class, Clovelly, Ilchester, Instow, Invergordon, Ironbridge and Ixworth were equipped to act as diving tenders. Lydford was originally commissioned as A510 Loyal Governor, then renamed P252 Alert for service in Ulster until 1986.

Ships in class

References

 

Royal Maritime Auxiliary Service
Ships of the Royal Navy